Enis is a given name. Notable people with the name include:

 Enis Alushi, German footballer
 Enis Bešlagić, Bosnia and Herzegovina actor
 Enis Batur, Turkish poet
 Enis Esmer, Canadian actor
 Enis Hajri, Tunisian footballer

Other uses

 Enna Satham Indha Neram, a 2014 Indian film
Turkish masculine given names